H. velifer may refer to:

Haplochromis velifer, a fish species
Histiodraco velifer, a fish species